Wee Peem was a British comic strip character in The Beano, first written and designed by James Jewell. He starred in two comic strips between 1938 and 1957, and would get up to various forms of mischief in a similar way to later Beano strips such as Dennis the Menace and Minnie the Minx.

Synopsis 
Peem is a little boy with a large, round head with long limbs, usually dressed in a stripy jumper, shorts, and a strip cap too small for his head. His stories would be about his misbehaviours irritating and angering adults. His name is "Little James" in the Scots language.

Character history
Peem debuted in Wee Peem (He's a Proper Scream) in The Beano first issue with Lord Snooty and His Pals, Helpful Henry, Morgyn the Mighty, The Adventures of Tom Thumb, and Big Eggo. The Beano magazine contained two types of children's fiction: comic strips and adventure prose stories; Wee Peem was the former, inspired by the funny pages of American newspapers. When it ended in issue 89, DC Thomson reprinted some of the Wee Peem strips in The People's Journal, along with some new stories by James Malcolm.

A similar character in both appearance and mannerisms appeared in the first Dandy Monster Comic under the name Dipper the Dodger.

Peem returned to The Beano a decade later in issue 486's Wee Peem's Magic Pills, a 21-issue series by Charles Grigg about Peem and his mischief after finding a bottle of tablets (named B-Pills) that fell from Dr Quack's medicine truck. Peem made his first Beano Annual appearance in 1940. 

In 1956, the Wee Peem strip got rebooted by Hugh Morren for 51 stories between issues 714 and 765. As of 2021, it was the last time Peem had a Beano series, although he would make appearances for the 80th anniversary in both the 2019 Beano Annual and the 80th-anniversary issue.

References

Notes

Bibliography

Citations 

Beano strips
1938 comics debuts
1957 comics endings
Comics characters introduced in 1938
Comics characters who use magic
British comics characters
Child characters in comics
Fictional tricksters
Gag-a-day comics
Fantasy comics
Fictional Scottish people